Robert McClellan (October 2, 1806 – June 28, 1860) was an American lawyer and politician who served two non-consecutive terms as a U.S. Representative from New York from 1837 to 1839, and from 1841 to 1843.

Biography 
Born in Livingston, New York, McClellan was graduated from Williams College, Williamstown, Massachusetts, in 1825.
He studied law.
He was admitted to the bar and practiced his profession in Middleburgh, New York from 1828 to 1843.

Congress 
McClellan was elected as a Democrat to the Twenty-fifth Congress (March 4, 1837 – March 3, 1839).

McClellan was elected to the Twenty-seventh Congress (March 4, 1841 – March 3, 1843).

He served as chairman of the Committee on Patents (Twenty-seventh Congress).

Death 
He died in Greenpoint, Brooklyn, New York, June 28, 1860.
He was interred in Greenwood Cemetery.

Sources

1806 births
1860 deaths
Williams College alumni
Burials at Green-Wood Cemetery
Democratic Party members of the United States House of Representatives from New York (state)
People from Livingston, New York
People from Middleburgh, New York
19th-century American politicians